The Papeno'o River is a river on the island of Tahiti in French Polynesia.

The river rises in the mountains of Tahiti east of the town center of Papeete and ends on the coast of Tahiti near Pape'eno. It is about 20 miles long and is about 10 feet wide at the mouth. All the water ends in the Pacific Ocean. The river forms as a little trickle from the little snow melt of Mont Orohena in the center of Tahiti and flows northward toward Arue. As it flows north, it collects more and more snow melt. Eventually, it becomes a 10 foot wide river 12 miles south of the ocean.  Once it reaches the Tahiti Freeway, it becomes a 20 foot wide river. The river's highest elevation is 4,000 feet in the mountains of Tahiti. The lowest elevation is 2 feet once the Papeno'o River meets the Pacific Ocean. 

The river was previously called Vaituaru, "the stream that destroys everything in its path".

See also
List of rivers of Oceania

References

Rivers of Tahiti